A roundup is a systematic gathering together of people or things.

Roundup, Round Up or Round-up may also refer to:

Agriculture
 A muster (livestock) (AU/NZ) or a roundup (US/CA) is the process of gathering livestock.
 Roundup (herbicide), a Monsanto brand of glyphosate-based herbicides
 Roundup Ready, a Monsanto trademark for patented GMO crop seeds

Arts and entertainment
The Round-Up (1920 film), a Western
The Round-Up (1941 film), a Western
The Round-Up (1966 film), a Hungarian film by Miklós Jancsó
The Round Up (2010 film), a French film
The Roundup (2022 film), a South Korean film
The Roundup: No Way Out, an upcoming sequel
Round-Up (video game), an arcade video game
Roundup (album), an album by Denise Ho
"Round Up", a rap single by Lady May and Blu Cantrell
The Roundup, a former Canadian radio program
Round Up (ride), an amusement park ride

Military and law enforcement
Operation Roundup (1942), WWII Allied plan to invade France
Operation Roundup (1951), an American attack in the Korean War
Roundup (police action), targeting random members of a group for mass arrest

Other uses
Rounding up, when a boat heads into the wind, the rudder having no effect
Roundup, Montana, US city
Roundup, Texas, a US city
Roundup (issue tracker), web-based issue or bug tracking system
Edsel Roundup, a 1950s station wagon built by FordThe Round Up'', student newspaper of New Mexico State University

See also
List of rodeos
Pendleton Round-Up, a rodeo in Oregon
Rattlesnake round-up
Surin Elephant Round-up, an annual event in Thailand